Gine may refer to:

People
 Alejandro Moya Gine, Spanish lightweight rower
 Aleksander Gine (1830–1980), Russian painter
 , French cartoonist
 Joan Giné i Partagàs (1836–1903), Spanish physician and writer
 Mary Gine Riley (1883–1939), American painter
 Uri Giné (born 1986), Spanish musician
 Xantal Giné (born 1992), Spanish field hockey defender

Other
 Gine, wife of the character Bardock
 "Giné", song by American rapper 6ix9ine